Zhavarud-e Gharbi Rural District is a rural district (dehestan) in Kalatrazan District, Sanandaj County, Kurdistan Province, Iran. At the 2006 census, its population was 6,819, in 1,696 families. The rural district has 12 villages.

References 

Rural Districts of Kurdistan Province
Sanandaj County